Edward Cliff (born 30 September 1951) is an English former professional footballer who played as a full back. Active in both England and the United States, Cliff made over 120 career appearances.

Career
Cliff began his career with Burnley, and made 21 league appearances between 1970 and 1973. Cliff then moved to Notts County, making five appearances in the 1973–74 season. Cliff then spent a loan spell at Lincoln City, making three appearances, before moving to the North American Soccer League to play with the Chicago Sting.
 Upon his return to the Football League in 1976, Cliff played with Tranmere Rovers and Rochdale.

References

1951 births
Living people
Burnley F.C. players
Chicago Sting (NASL) players
English footballers
English expatriate footballers
Lincoln City F.C. players
North American Soccer League (1968–1984) players
Notts County F.C. players
Rochdale A.F.C. players
Tranmere Rovers F.C. players
English Football League players
Association football fullbacks
English expatriate sportspeople in the United States
Expatriate soccer players in the United States